"Crush" is the pre-debut single by South Korean girl group I.O.I. It was released online as a digital single on April 5, 2016 through CJ E&M.

Background

CJ E&M formed I.O.I through the reality competition series Produce 101 on Mnet. The song "Crush" was announced to be the debut song for the winners of the series. However, shortly before the end of the series, YMC Entertainment and Mnet decided to postpone the debut of I.O.I until May to give the group more time to prepare. They decided that "Crush" would be released as a pre-debut single by I.O.I after the conclusion of Produce 101.

In the final episode, which was broadcast live on April 1, 2016, the remaining 22 contestants performed the song as their final assessment, after which viewers voted for their favorite contestant. After the voting period, the top 11 contestants were announced and became the members of the new group I.O.I. The members of I.O.I then recorded "Crush", which was released as a pre-debut single on April 5. The music video for the song was released the same day.

Commercial performance 
"Crush" entered and peaked at number 12 on the South Korea's Gaon Digital Chart, on the week ending April 9. On the following week ending April 16, the song fell eighteen places, charting at number 30. In its third and fourth consecutive week in the chart, the song stayed at number 39. In its seventh week, ending May 21, the song charted at number 81, the lowest since the debut.

On the Gaon Download Chart, the song entered and peaked at number 4 with 112,733 download sales on the week ending April 9. The song has sold 323,707 downloads to date.

On the Gaon Streaming Chart, the song entered at number 35 with 1,735,474 streams on the week ending April 9. On the following week ending April 16, the song peaked at number 33 with 1,794,313 streams. The song has been streamed 9,639,760 to date.

Track listing

Charts

Sales

References

2016 debut singles
2016 songs
Korean-language songs
I.O.I songs
Songs written by August Rigo
Songs written by Melanie Fontana
Songs written by Ryan S. Jhun